Sea Wolf is a 2-part TV miniseries aired in 2009, adapting the 1904 novel The Sea-Wolf, written by Jack London.

Plot
In a mishap, a young poetry critic  Humphrey van Weyden is cast adrift in the open sea. He is picked up by a seal hunting schooner, but his miraculous escape turns into a brutal struggle for survival. The schooner is captained by 'Wolf' Larsen - an authoritarian and harsh captain.

Production
The series was mostly shot in Halifax, Nova Scotia using the Halifax waterfront doubling as San Francisco with shipboard scenes filmed aboard the schooners Alabama, Silva and the museum ship CSS Acadia at the Maritime Museum of the Atlantic.

Cast
Sebastian Koch - Wolf Larsen
Tim Roth - Death Larsen
Neve Campbell - Maud Brewster
Stephen Campbell Moore - Humphrey Van Weyden
Andrew Jackson - Johnson
Tobias Schenke - Leach

References

External links
 

2009 television films
2009 films
2000s German television miniseries
2000s Canadian television miniseries
Television shows based on American novels
ZDF original programming
Films based on The Sea-Wolf
Television shows based on works by Jack London
English-language Canadian films
English-language German films
2000s Canadian films